Newman railway station was a station on the Wairarapa Line in the Tararua District area of the Manawatū-Whanganui region of New Zealand’s North Island. It is accessed via Cliff Road, but is now located on private property.

History

Early years 
The crossing of the Makakahi River by the Wellington – Woodville railway in December 1894 enabled the establishment of a station at Newman.  The station was initially freight-only, while passenger trains continued to terminate at nearby Eketahuna as it was the nearest station with passenger accommodations.

After the railway reached Eketahuna in 1889, local timber merchant Tom Price established a sawmill at Newman, named Albion Mill. At first, the timber was transported by cart to Eketahuna to be shipped out, but this caused problems with the local council when inclement weather caused his carts to damage the roads. Therefore, when Newman station was established, a siding was laid north of the station to his mill at the township of Newman. Until the mill closed in March 1900, it provided a significant source of traffic for the station.

Nireaha Tramway 
One of the most significant aspects of Newman’s history is its short-lived status as the junction with the Nireaha Tramway from 1895 to 1900.

Permission was first sought in 1893 to construct the line, and was intended to resolve the problems caused by transporting timber using carts on the roads.  Price was fortunate in that an economic depression had caused work on the government Wellington – Woodville railway to stall at Eketahuna, leading to the availability of a pool of skilled labour.  These men were employed by Price to construct and run his tramway.  The  line started at the Albion Mill and passed by the township of Nireaha before terminating at a sawmill Price had established there on the eastern bank of the Mangatainoka River.  This mill was destroyed by fire shortly after commencing operation and was not replaced.

Motive power was initially provided by horses, but later a unique Aveling and Porter steam locomotive was employed.  The locomotive was a wood-burner, and was imported from England by Price who had it assembled at Newman.  It started service on 2 July 1896, and was driven by a local settler.  Following the closure of the mill, the locomotive was relocated to Petone and later sold to mill operators in the King Country where it ended its working life in the 1920s.

By 1900 most of the native timber in the area had been milled, causing Price to close his mill and relocate his plant to Dannevirke.  Other millers in Nireaha continued to use the tramway, employing horses for motive power, and Eastern Nireaha children also used the line as a walking track to get to school in Newman.

Services 
After completion of the main line to Woodville in 1897, Newman became a stopping place for a variety of locomotive-hauled trains.  Later passenger services were provided first by the Wairarapa-class RM railcars, and later, the twinset railcars.  The 1959 railcar timetable for the Woodville–Masterton–Wellington and Wellington–Masterton–Woodville routes shows Newman as a "stops if required" station for the 15 services both ways each week.

Railcar services were withdrawn from the Wairarapa Line in the mid-1970s, after which locomotive-hauled carriage trains provided passenger services on the northern section until they were cancelled on 1 August 1988.  By this time Newman had been closed to passenger traffic for nearly two decades.

Today 
Little can be found at the station site now to indicate what was once located there.  The main loading bank and the remains of a building or other loading facility are the only visible remnants.

References

Footnotes 

Buildings and structures in Manawatū-Whanganui
Rail transport in Manawatū-Whanganui
Railway stations opened in 1896
Defunct railway stations in New Zealand
Railway stations closed in 1973
1896 establishments in New Zealand
1973 disestablishments in New Zealand
Tararua District